Larry Long may refer to:
 Larry Long (politician), former Attorney General of South Dakota
 Larry Long (singer-songwriter) (born 1951), activist from Minnesota